Thomas Christopher Cannon (born 28 December 2002) is a professional footballer who plays as a forward for Preston North End on loan from Everton. Born in England, he is a youth international for Ireland. He is an Ireland U21 international after choosing to represent Ireland

Club career
Cannon is a youth product of Everton, having signed with the club at the age of 10. He signed his first professional contract in March 2021, penning a two year contract until June 2023. He signed a contract extension in August 2022 which would take him to June 2025/ He made his senior and professional debut with Everton as a late substitute in a 4–1 EFL Cup loss to AFC Bournemouth on 8th November 2022. Cannon went on to make his Premier League debut as a 74th minute substitute in Everton's 3-0 away loss to Bournemouth on 12th November 2022.

On 10 January 2023, Cannon joined Championship club Preston North End on loan until the end of the season. Cannon made his EFL Championship debut on 14 January 2023, in an 4-0 loss against Norwich City.  Cannon scored his first goal against Wigan Athletic on the 25 February.

International career
Cannon received his first call up for the Republic of Ireland Under 19s squad in October 2019 and played in three Under 19 European Championship qualifier matches against Switzerland, Gibraltar and Denmark, scoring his first international goal against Gibraltar.

Cannon was next called up to an Under 20s squad in March 2022 and played in a friendly match against an Ireland Amateurs side.

His first call up for the Republic of Ireland U21 team came in March 2023, for a friendly against Iceland U21.

Career statistics

References

2002 births
Living people
People from Aintree
Republic of Ireland association footballers
Republic of Ireland youth international footballers
English footballers
English people of Irish descent
Association football forwards
Everton F.C. players
Preston North End F.C. players
Premier League players